The arrondissement of Pontoise is an arrondissement of France in the Val-d'Oise department in the Île-de-France region. It has 105 communes.

Composition

The communes of the arrondissement of Pontoise, and their INSEE codes, are:

 Ableiges (95002)
 Aincourt (95008)
 Ambleville (95011)
 Amenucourt (95012)
 Arronville (95023)
 Arthies (95024)
 Auvers-sur-Oise (95039)
 Avernes (95040)
 Banthelu (95046)
 Beaumont-sur-Oise (95052)
 Le Bellay-en-Vexin (95054)
 Bernes-sur-Oise (95058)
 Berville (95059)
 Béthemont-la-Forêt (95061)
 Boisemont (95074)
 Boissy-l'Aillerie (95078)
 Bray-et-Lû (95101)
 Bréançon (95102)
 Brignancourt (95110)
 Bruyères-sur-Oise (95116)
 Buhy (95119)
 Butry-sur-Oise (95120)
 Cergy (95127)
 Champagne-sur-Oise (95134)
 La Chapelle-en-Vexin (95139)
 Charmont (95141)
 Chars (95142)
 Chaussy (95150)
 Chauvry (95151)
 Chérence (95157)
 Cléry-en-Vexin (95166)
 Commeny (95169)
 Condécourt (95170)
 Cormeilles-en-Vexin (95177)
 Courcelles-sur-Viosne (95181)
 Courdimanche (95183)
 Ennery (95211)
 Épiais-Rhus (95213)
 Éragny (95218)
 Frémainville (95253)
 Frémécourt (95254)
 Frouville (95258)
 Genainville (95270)
 Génicourt (95271)
 Gouzangrez (95282)
 Grisy-les-Plâtres (95287)
 Guiry-en-Vexin (95295)
 Haravilliers (95298)
 Haute-Isle (95301)
 Le Heaulme (95303)
 Hédouville (95304)
 Hérouville-en-Vexin (95308)
 Hodent (95309)
 L'Isle-Adam (95313)
 Jouy-le-Moutier (95323)
 Labbeville (95328)
 Livilliers (95341)
 Longuesse (95348)
 Magny-en-Vexin (95355)
 Marines (95370)
 Maudétour-en-Vexin (95379)
 Menouville (95387)
 Menucourt (95388)
 Mériel (95392)
 Méry-sur-Oise (95394)
 Montgeroult (95422)
 Montreuil-sur-Epte (95429)
 Mours (95436)
 Moussy (95438)
 Nerville-la-Forêt (95445)
 Nesles-la-Vallée (95446)
 Neuilly-en-Vexin (95447)
 Neuville-sur-Oise (95450)
 Nointel (95452)
 Noisy-sur-Oise (95456)
 Nucourt (95459)
 Omerville (95462)
 Osny (95476)
 Parmain (95480)
 Le Perchay (95483)
 Persan (95487)
 Pontoise (95500)
 Presles (95504)
 Puiseux-Pontoise (95510)
 La Roche-Guyon (95523)
 Ronquerolles (95529)
 Sagy (95535)
 Saint-Clair-sur-Epte (95541)
 Saint-Cyr-en-Arthies (95543)
 Saint-Gervais (95554)
 Saint-Ouen-l'Aumône (95572)
 Santeuil (95584)
 Seraincourt (95592)
 Théméricourt (95610)
 Theuville (95611)
 Us (95625)
 Vallangoujard (95627)
 Valmondois (95628)
 Vauréal (95637)
 Vétheuil (95651)
 Vienne-en-Arthies (95656)
 Vigny (95658)
 Villers-en-Arthies (95676)
 Villiers-Adam (95678)
 Wy-dit-Joli-Village (95690)

History

The arrondissement of Pontoise was created in 1800 as part of the department Seine-et-Oise. In 1968 it became part of the new department Val-d'Oise. At the January 2017 reorganisation of the arrondissements of Val-d'Oise, it received one commune from the arrondissement of Sarcelles, and it lost 10 communes to the arrondissement of Argenteuil and two communes to the arrondissement of Sarcelles.

As a result of the reorganisation of the cantons of France which came into effect in 2015, the borders of the cantons are no longer related to the borders of the arrondissements. The cantons of the arrondissement of Pontoise were, as of January 2015:

 Beauchamp
 Beaumont-sur-Oise
 Cergy-Nord
 Cergy-Sud
 Eaubonne
 Ermont
 Franconville
 L'Hautil
 L'Isle-Adam
 Magny-en-Vexin
 Marines
 Pontoise
 Saint-Leu-la-Forêt
 Saint-Ouen-l'Aumône
 Taverny
 La Vallée-du-Sausseron
 Vigny

References

Pontoise